Akilla's Escape is a 2020 drama film, directed by Charles Officer. The film stars Saul Williams as Akilla, a marijuana dealer retiring from the business following legalization, who tries to rescue a young boy (Thamela Mpumlwana) from being drawn into a life of crime.

The film, which Officer began writing in 2010, was inspired by the police crackdown on the Toronto chapter of the Shower Posse crime gang. Its cast also includes Vic Mensa, Oluniké Adeliyi, Ronnie Rowe, Theresa Tova, Brandon Oakes, Sagine Sémajuste and Colm Feore. The film's original score is produced by Saul Williams with Robert Del Naja of Massive Attack.

The film premiered at the 2020 Toronto International Film Festival, with further screenings at the Vancouver International Film Festival, the Atlanta International Film Festival, the Santa Barbara International Film Festival, The Trinidad & Tobago Film Festival, and Hof International Film Festival. The film was nominated for 8 Canadian Screen Awards and won 5 Canadian Screen Awards in total.

Reception 
The site's critical consensus reads, "Akilla's Escape occasionally loses sight of its strongest assets, but solid acting and a smart story make this a neo-noir worth watching."

Writing for Now and The Georgia Straight, Norman Wilner wrote that "Officer does something else with Akilla’s Escape that I’m hesitant to discuss, but when you see it you’ll hopefully be as stunned and impressed as I was. It’s not a plot twist, but rather a creative decision that pays off absolutely brilliantly over the course of the movie, giving flesh to its central metaphor and making the story play on at least two different levels above and beyond what happens in the narrative."

The Los Angeles Times wrote "The film remains firmly rooted in Williams' quietly powerful and laser focused performance."

The Film Stage included it in their list of "The Best Films from Venice, TIFF, and NYFF 2020", and the Toronto Star named it as one of the ten best films at the festival.

Awards and nominations

References

External links

2020 films
American crime drama films
Canadian crime drama films
English-language Canadian films
Films shot in Toronto
Films set in Toronto
Films directed by Charles Officer
2020 drama films
Hood films
2020s English-language films
2020s Canadian films
2020s American films